Karacha-Yelga (Qarasayılğa) is a rural locality (a selo) and the administrative centre of Karacha-Yelginsky Selsoviet, Kushnarenkovsky District, Bashkortostan, Russia. The population was 600 as of 2010. There are 8 streets.

Geography 
Karacha-Yelga is located 23 km northwest of Kushnarenkovo (the district's administrative centre) by road. Chirsha-Tartysh is the nearest rural locality.

References 

Rural localities in Kushnarenkovsky District